Miguel Ângelo Henriques Carvalho (born 2 September 1994) is a Portuguese racewalker. He placed 36th in the men's 50 kilometres walk at the 2016 Summer Olympics.

References

1994 births
Living people
People from Rio Maior
Portuguese male racewalkers
Olympic athletes of Portugal
Athletes (track and field) at the 2016 Summer Olympics
S.L. Benfica athletes
Sportspeople from Santarém District